A front rounded vowel is a particular type of vowel that is both front and rounded.

The front rounded vowels defined by the IPA include:
 , a close front rounded vowel (or "high front rounded vowel")
 , a near-close front rounded vowel (or "near-high ...")
 , a close-mid front rounded vowel (or "high-mid ...")
 , a mid front rounded vowel
 , an open-mid front rounded vowel (or "low-mid ...")
 , an open front rounded vowel (or "low ...")

Front rounded vowels are cross-linguistically relatively uncommon, but occur in a number of well-known languages, including French, German, Turkish and Mandarin.

Lip rounding is produced by bringing the corners of the lips together and protruding them forward. This is harder to do while producing low or open vowels, since the lips are being stressed vertically. This may explain why low vowels are usually unrounded. Roundedness is usually associated with back vowels. This helps to reinforce the low-pitched acoustic overtones associated with back vowels. This makes rounded back vowels more distinct from other vowels.

The high vowel  is the most common, while the low vowel  is extremely rare. This is consistent with the general correlation between rounding and vowel height.

Front rounded vowels usually occur in languages with vowel systems that distinguish a higher than average number of different vowel qualities. Typically, when a front rounded vowel occurs, the inventory of vowels includes an unrounded front vowel and a rounded back vowel of similar height. Because of this, and what's known about many languages with front rounded vowels, front rounded vowels typically reflect a development from a vowel system that previously had fewer members.

Geographical distribution 
Most languages with front rounded vowels are found in the more northern parts of Eurasia.

Language families in which front-rounded vowels are common are:
 Some Sino-Tibetan languages: 
 Chinese varieties (e.g. Mandarin including Standard Chinese; Cantonese; Wu Chinese)
 Standard Tibetan
 Various Indo-European languages:
 Modern Germanic languages (with the notable exceptions of the largest dialects of Modern English (although [yː] for /uː/ is found in some accents in Northern England, and [øː] is a common South African realization of /ɜː/), Yiddish, and many German dialects)
 Gallo-Romance languages (except Catalan), a subset of the Romance languages (e.g. French, Occitan, Lombard)
 Albanian
 Ancient Greek
 Turkic languages (e.g. Turkish, Uyghur)
 Mongolic languages (e.g. Kalmyk, Dagur language, Inner Mongolian dialects; but not standard Khalkha)
 Uralic languages (e.g. Finnish, Hungarian)

Development 
Many of the Uralic, Mongolic, and Turkic languages which contain front rounded vowels also have vowel harmony systems, such as rounding or backness harmony. The processes which bring about fronting or roundedness harmony may be important in introducing front rounded vowels into a language's inventory.

Front rounded vowels can also develop independently of vowel harmony. In French,  is the result of an older  moving forward while remaining rounded. French re-developed  by moving  upwards. Some varieties of modern English are similarly fronting . In cases like these the creation of front rounded vowels is independent of adjacent sounds in the word.

In other languages front rounded vowels evolved as previously back vowels became fronted by adjacent segments. For example, in German, back vowels became fronted when followed by high front vowels. The front vowels causing this change were often in inflectional or derivational endings and were then lost or changed into mid vowels.

Considering the different historical scenarios which can give rise to front rounded vowels, it is notable that they are relatively concentrated in a particular geographical region. It's likely that the presence of front rounded vowels in some languages can facilitate phonetically-motivated processes in other nearby languages.

References

Front vowels
Rounded vowels